was a noted Japanese lichenologist and 1994 recipient of the Acharius Medal. He studied under Mason Hale and Yasuhiko Asahina.

Eponyms
Several lichen species have been named to honour Kurokawa. These eponyms include: Usnea kurokawae ; Parmelia kurokawae ; Lobaria kurokawae ; Physconia kurokawae ; Cetraria kurokawae ; Heterodermia kurokawae ; Scleropyrenium kurokawae ; Cladonia kurokawae ; Ramalina kurokawae ; Parmotrema kurokawianum ; Fellhaneropsis kurokawae ; Graphis kurokawae ; and Lecanora kurokawae .

See also
List of mycologists
:Category:Taxa named by Syo Kurokawa

Citations

References

1926 births
2010 deaths
20th-century Japanese botanists
Japanese lichenologists
Acharius Medal recipients